Kuikka-Koponen (born Abel Koponen; December 1, 1833 in Heinävesi – December 12, 1890) was an illusionist and magician in folklore from Savo in Finland. He was a hypnotist and escapologist.

Selected works 
 Marjut Hjelt (toim.): Kuikka-Koponen: Tarinoita savolaisesta silmänkääntäjästä. 2. täydennetty painos. Folklore-sarja. Helsinki: Suomalaisen Kirjallisuuden Seura, 1998. . 
 Markku Turunen: Kuikka-Koponen (+näytelmäsovitus Savonlinnan kaupunginteatterille 1999). Gummerus, 1998. . 
 Marjut Kivelä: Kuikka-Koponen. Suomalaisen Kirjallisuuden Seura, 1980. .
 Juttuja Kuikka-Koposesta, Lapatossusta Ym.. Kirjapaino Teho H:ki, 1944.

References 

1833 births
1890 deaths
People from Heinävesi
People from Mikkeli Province (Grand Duchy of Finland)
Finnish magicians
Escapologists